Corbitella is a genus of glass sponges (Hexactinellids) belonging to the family Euplectellidae.

References

External links 

 
 
 

Hexactinellida genera
Taxa named by John Edward Gray